The MLB Draft League is a collegiate summer baseball league that began play in 2021. Created by Major League Baseball (MLB) and Prep Baseball Report, the league serves as a showcase for top draft-eligible prospects leading up to each summer's MLB draft. The league's initial six teams were formerly members of Minor League Baseball's New York–Penn League, Eastern League, and Carolina League before MLB's reorganization of the minors for 2021. In 2021, each team in the league played a  regular season, with an All-Star Break taking place around the MLB draft. The season was expanded to 80 games per team beginning in 2022.

Current teams

References

External links
Official website

MLB Draft League

2021 establishments in the United States
Summer baseball leagues
College baseball leagues in the United States